Berlin Bohème is a German television series (soap opera), produced in 53 episodes from 1999 to 2005.  The series depicts the lives of Bohemian artists in Berlin; the majority of the protagonists were gay or lesbian. The creator and producer of this show is Andreas Weiss, who produced several other gay and lesbian TV-series before.

See also
List of German television series

External links
 

1999 German television series debuts
2005 German television series endings
German LGBT-related television shows
Television shows set in Berlin
German-language television shows
1990s LGBT-related drama television series
2000s LGBT-related drama television series